Nevada Fighter is the third solo album by American singer-songwriter Michael Nesmith during his post-Monkees career. The album is also the third and final album with Nesmith backed by the First National Band. Released by RCA Records in 1971, the LP failed to chart in the top 200 but bubbled under at #218. The lead off single "Nevada Fighter" peaked at No. 70 on the Billboard charts and No. 67 in Canada.

John London and John Ware left the group in late November 1970. Two tracks were left to finish the album - "Here I Am" (recorded in early January 1971) and "Only Bound" (recorded in late January). Nesmith recruited James Burton, Joe Osborn and Ron Tutt to help finish the album — all three had worked with Nesmith during his days with The Monkees.

The track "Nevada Fighter" was originally recorded under the title "Apology." "Propinquity" was the third version of this song Nesmith recorded — he demoed it for The Monkees in 1966 and recorded a 1968 version for the group.

Track listing
All songs by Michael Nesmith except where noted.
 "Grand Ennui" – 2:07
 "Propinquity (I've Just Begun to Care)" – 2:59
 "Here I Am" – 3:15
 "Only Bound" – 3:23
 "Nevada Fighter" – 3:06
 "Texas Morning" (Mike Murphy, Boomer Castleman) – 3:00
 "Tumbling Tumbleweeds" (Bob Nolan) – 4:10
 "I Looked Away" (Eric Clapton, Bobby Whitlock) – 3:13
 "Rainmaker" (Harry Nilsson, Bill Martin) – 3:17
 "René" (Red Rhodes) – 1:40

Charts

Personnel
 Michael Nesmith – vocals, guitar
 John London – bass
 John Ware – drums
 Red Rhodes – pedal steel
Additional musicians:
 Joe Osborn – bass
 Max Bennett – bass
 Glen Hardin – keyboards
 Michael Cohen – keyboards
 Ron Tutt – drums
 James Burton – guitar
 Al Casey – guitar

References

1971 albums
Michael Nesmith albums
RCA Records albums